Sergey Lovachov (born May 18, 1959) is a retired track and field sprinter from Uzbekistan, known for winning the gold medal for the Soviet Union in the men's 4x400 metres relay at the inaugural 1983 World Championships. He did so alongside Aleksandr Troshchilo, Nikolay Chernetskiy, and Viktor Markin, clocking a total time of 3:00.79. He set his personal best (45.37) in the 400 metres on 1984-06-22 at a meet in Kiev.

References

1959 births
Living people
Uzbekistani male sprinters
Soviet male sprinters
Place of birth missing (living people)
World Athletics Championships medalists
World Athletics Championships winners
Friendship Games medalists in athletics